The Steam Packet Inn was a public house located at 2/4 Duke Street, Ipswich, Suffolk, England. It closed on 18 September 1960. The building had been owned by Cobbold Brewery but after closure it was sold to Eastern Counties Farmers (ECF). The Burns family then lived there, Mr Burns being employed by ECF.

References

Pubs in Ipswich
Former pubs in England
Cobbold pubs